Jason M. White (born December 28, 1972) is an American politician. He is a member of the Mississippi House of Representatives from the 48th District, being first elected in 2011. He is a member of the Republican party.

References

1972 births
21st-century American politicians
Living people
Members of the Mississippi House of Representatives
Mississippi Democrats
Mississippi Republicans
Place of birth missing (living people)